The Bayer designation Omega Aquilae (ω Aql / ω Aquilae) is shared by two stars in the constellation Aquila:
 Omega¹ Aquilae (Flamsteed designation 25 Aquilae.)
 Omega² Aquilae (Flamsteed designation 29 Aquilae.)
They are separated by 0.51° on the sky.

Aquilae, Omega
Aquila (constellation)